The goat or domestic goat (Capra hircus) is a domesticated species of goat-antelope typically kept as livestock. It was domesticated from the wild goat (C. aegagrus) of Southwest Asia and Eastern Europe. The goat is a member of the animal family Bovidae and the tribe Caprini, meaning it is closely related to the sheep. There are over 300 distinct breeds of goat. It is one of the oldest domesticated species of animal, according to archaeological evidence that its earliest domestication occurred in Iran at 10,000 calibrated calendar years ago.  Goats have been used for milk, meat, fur, and skins across much of the world. Milk from goats is often turned into goat cheese.

Female goats are referred to as does or nannies, intact males are called bucks or billies, and juvenile goats of both sexes are called kids. Castrated males are called wethers. While the words hircine and caprine both refer to anything having a goat-like quality, hircine is used most often to emphasize the distinct smell of domestic goats.

In 2011, there were more than 924 million goats living in the world, according to the UN Food and Agriculture Organization.

Etymology 
 
The Modern English word goat comes from Old English gāt "she-goat, goat in general", which in turn derives from Proto-Germanic *gaitaz (cf. Dutch/Frisian/Icelandic/Norwegian geit, German Geiß, and Gothic gaits), ultimately from Proto-Indo-European *ǵʰaidos meaning "young goat" (cf. Latin haedus "kid"). To refer to the male goat, Old English used bucca (cf. Dutch/Frisian bok and giving modern buck) until ousted by hegote, hegoote in the late 12th century. Nanny goat (females) originated in the 18th century, and billy goat (for males) originated in the 19th century.

History 

Goats are among the earliest animals domesticated by humans. The most recent genetic analysis confirms the archaeological evidence that the wild bezoar ibex of the Zagros Mountains is the likely original ancestor of probably all domestic goats today.

Neolithic farmers began to herd wild goats primarily for easy access to milk and meat, as well as to their dung, which was used as fuel; and their bones, hair, and sinew were used for clothing, building, and tools. The earliest remnants of domesticated goats dating 10,000 years Before Present are found in Ganj Dareh in Iran. Goat remains have been found at archaeological sites in Jericho, Choga Mami,<ref>Maisels, C.K. Near East: Archaeology in the 'Cradle of Civilization' The Near East: Archaeology in the Cradle of Civilization Routledge, 1999; p.124</ref> Djeitun, and Çayönü, dating the domestication of goats in Western Asia at between 8,000 and 9,000 years ago.

Studies of DNA evidence suggests 10,000 years ago as the domestication date.

Historically, goat hide has been used for water and wine bottles in both traveling and transporting wine for sale. It has also been used to produce parchment.

 Anatomy and health 
Within each breed, different strains or bloodlines may have different recognized sizes. At the bottom of the size range are miniature breeds such as the African Pygmy, which stand  at the shoulder as adults.

Horns

Most goats naturally have two horns, of various shapes and sizes depending on the breed. There have been incidents of polycerate goats (having as many as eight horns), although this is a genetic rarity thought to be inherited. Unlike cattle, goats have not been successfully bred to be reliably polled, as the genes determining sex and those determining horns are closely linked. Breeding together two genetically polled goats results in a high number of intersex individuals among the offspring, which are typically sterile. Their horns are made of living bone surrounded by keratin and other proteins, and are used for defense, dominance, and territoriality.

Digestion and lactation
Goats are ruminants. They have a four-chambered stomach consisting of the rumen, the reticulum, the omasum, and the abomasum. As with other mammal ruminants, they are even-toed ungulates. The females have an udder consisting of two teats, in contrast to cattle, which have four teats. An exception to this is the Boer goat, which sometimes may have up to eight teats.

Eyes
Goats have horizontal, slit-shaped pupils. Because goats' irises are usually pale, their contrasting pupils are much more noticeable than in animals such as cattle, deer, most horses, and many sheep, whose similarly horizontal pupils blend into a dark iris and sclera.
Goats have no tear ducts.

Beards
Both male and female goats may have beards, and many types of goat (most commonly dairy goats, dairy-cross Boers, and pygmy goats) may have wattles, one dangling from each side of the neck.

Tan

Goats expressing the tan pattern have coats pigmented completely with pheomelanin (tan/brown pigment). The allele which codes for this pattern is located at the agouti locus of the goat genome. It is completely dominant to all other alleles at this locus. There are multiple modifier genes which control how much tan pigment is actually expressed, so a tan-patterned goat can have a coat ranging from pure white to deep red.

 Reproduction 

Goats reach puberty between three and 15 months of age, depending on breed and nutritional status. Many breeders prefer to postpone breeding until the doe has reached 70% of the adult weight. However, this separation is rarely possible in extensively managed, open-range herds.

In temperate climates and among the Swiss breeds, the breeding season commences as the day length shortens, and ends in early spring or before. In equatorial regions, goats are able to breed at any time of the year. Successful breeding in these regions depends more on available forage than on day length. Does of any breed or region come into estrus (heat) every 21 days for two to 48 hours. A doe in heat typically flags (vigorously wags) her tail often, stays near the buck if one is present, becomes more vocal, and may also show a decrease in appetite and milk production for the duration of the heat.

Bucks (intact males) of Swiss and northern breeds come into rut in the fall as with the does' heat cycles. Bucks of equatorial breeds may show seasonal reduced fertility, but as with the does, are capable of breeding at all times. Rut is characterized by a decrease in appetite and obsessive interest in the does. A buck in rut will display flehmen lip curling and will urinate on his forelegs and face. Sebaceous scent glands at the base of the horns add to the male goat's odor, which is important to make him attractive to the female. Some does will not mate with a buck which has been descented.

In addition to natural, traditional mating, artificial insemination has gained popularity among goat breeders, as it allows easy access to a wide variety of bloodlines.

Gestation length is approximately 150 days. Twins are the usual result, with single and triplet births also common. Less frequent are litters of quadruplet, quintuplet, and even sextuplet kids. Birthing, known as kidding, generally occurs uneventfully. Just before kidding, the doe will have a sunken area around the tail and hip, as well as heavy breathing. She may have a worried look, become restless and display great affection for her keeper. The mother often eats the placenta, which gives her much-needed nutrients, helps stanch her bleeding, and parallels the behavior of wild herbivores, such as deer, to reduce the lure of the birth scent for predators.

On average, a good quality dairy doe will give at least  of milk per day while she is in milk. After the lactation, the doe will "dry off", typically after she has been bred. Occasionally, goats that have not been bred and are continuously milked will continue lactation beyond the typical 305 days. Meat, fiber, and pet breeds are not usually milked and simply produce enough for the kids until weaning.

Male lactation is also known to occur in goats.

Diet
Goats are reputed to be willing to eat almost anything, including tin cans and cardboard boxes. While goats will not actually eat inedible material, they are browsing animals, not grazers like cattle and sheep, and (coupled with their highly curious nature) will chew on and taste just about anything remotely resembling plant matter to decide whether it is good to eat, including cardboard, clothing and paper (such as labels from tin cans).

Aside from sampling many things, goats are quite particular in what they actually consume, preferring to browse on the tips of woody shrubs and trees, as well as the occasional broad-leaved plant. However, it can fairly be said that their plant diet is extremely varied, and includes some species which are otherwise toxic. They will seldom consume soiled food or contaminated water unless facing starvation. This is one reason goat-rearing is most often free-ranging, since stall-fed goat-rearing involves extensive upkeep and is seldom commercially viable.

Goats prefer to browse on vines, such as kudzu, on shrubbery and on weeds, more like deer than sheep, preferring them to grasses. Nightshade is poisonous; wilted fruit tree leaves can also kill goats. Silage (fermented corn stalks) and haylage (fermented grass hay) can be used if consumed immediately after opening – goats are particularly sensitive to Listeria bacteria that can grow in fermented feeds. Alfalfa, a high-protein plant, is widely fed as hay; fescue is the least palatable and least nutritious hay. Mold in a goat's feed can make it sick and possibly kill it. In various places in China, goats are used in the production of tea. Goats are released onto the tea terraces where they avoid consuming the green tea leaves (which contain bitter tasting substances), but instead eat the weeds. The goats' droppings fertilise the tea plants.

The digestive physiology of a very young kid (like the young of other ruminants) is essentially the same as that of a monogastric animal. Milk digestion begins in the abomasum, the milk having bypassed the rumen via closure of the reticuloesophageal groove during suckling. At birth, the rumen is undeveloped, but as the kid begins to consume solid feed, the rumen soon increases in size and in its capacity to absorb nutrients.

The adult size of a particular goat is a product of its breed (genetic potential) and its diet while growing (nutritional potential). As with all livestock, increased protein diets (10 to 14%) and sufficient calories during the prepuberty period yield higher growth rates and larger eventual size than lower protein rates and limited calories. Large-framed goats, with a greater skeletal size, reach mature weight at a later age (36 to 42 months) than small-framed goats (18 to 24 months) if both are fed to their full potential. Large-framed goats need more calories than small-framed goats for maintenance of daily functions.

Behavior

Goats are naturally curious. They are also agile and well known for their ability to climb and balance in precarious places. This makes them the only ruminant to regularly climb trees. Due to their agility and inquisitiveness, they are notorious for escaping their pens by testing fences and enclosures, either intentionally or simply because they are used to climbing. If any of the fencing can be overcome, goats will almost inevitably escape. Goats have been found to be as intelligent as dogs by some studies.

When handled as a group, goats tend to display less herding behavior than sheep. When grazing undisturbed, they tend to spread across the field or range, rather than feed side by side as do sheep. When nursing young, goats will leave their kids separated ("lying out") rather than clumped, as do sheep. They will generally turn and face an intruder and bucks are more likely to charge or butt at humans than are rams.

A study by Queen Mary University reports that goats try to communicate with people in the same manner as domesticated animals such as dogs and horses. Goats were first domesticated as livestock more than 10,000 years ago. Research conducted to test communication skills found that the goats will look to a human for assistance when faced with a challenge that had previously been mastered, but was then modified. Specifically, when presented with a box, the goat was able to remove the lid and retrieve a treat inside, but when the box was turned so the lid could not be removed, the goat would turn and gaze at the person and move toward them, before looking back toward the box. This is the same type of complex communication observed by animals bred as domestic pets, such as dogs. Researchers believe that better understanding of human-goat interaction could offer overall improvement in the animals' welfare. The field of anthrozoology has established that domesticated animals have the capacity for complex communication with humans when in 2015 a Japanese scientist determined that levels of oxytocin did increase in human subjects when dogs were exposed to a dose of the "love hormone", proving that a human-animal bond does exist. This is the same affinity that was proven with the London study above; goats are intelligent, capable of complex communication, and able to form bonds.

Diseases

While goats are generally considered hardy animals and in many situations receive little medical care, they are subject to a number of diseases. Among the conditions affecting goats are respiratory diseases including pneumonia, foot rot, internal parasites, pregnancy toxicosis, and feed toxicity. Feed toxicity can vary based on breed and location. Certain foreign fruits and vegetables can be toxic to different breeds of goats.

Goats can become infected with various viral and bacterial diseases, such as foot-and-mouth disease, caprine arthritis encephalitis, caseous lymphadenitis, pinkeye, mastitis, and pseudorabies. They can transmit a number of zoonotic diseases to people, such as tuberculosis, brucellosis, Q fever, and rabies.

Life expectancy
Life expectancy for goats is between 15 and 18 years. An instance of a goat reaching the age of 24 has been reported.

Several factors can reduce this average expectancy; problems during kidding can lower a doe's expected life span to 10 or 11, and stresses of going into rut can lower a buck's expected life span to eight to 10 years.

 Agriculture 

A goat is useful to humans when it is living and when it is dead, first as a renewable provider of milk, manure, and fiber, and then as meat and hide. Some charities provide goats to impoverished people in poor countries, because goats are easier and cheaper to manage than cattle, and have multiple uses. In addition, goats are used for driving and packing purposes.

The intestine of goats is used to make "catgut", which is still in use as a material for internal human surgical sutures and strings for musical instruments. The horn of the goat, which signifies plenty and wellbeing (the cornucopia), is also used to make spoons.

 Worldwide population statistics 
According to the Food and Agriculture Organization (FAO), the top producers of goat milk in 2008 were India (4 million metric tons), Bangladesh (2.16 million metric tons), and the Sudan (1.47 million metric tons). India slaughters 41% of 124.4 million goats each year. The 0.6 million metric tonnes of goat meat make up 8% of India's annual meat production. Approximately 440 million goats are slaughtered each year for meat worldwide.

 Husbandry 

Husbandry, or animal care and use, varies by region and culture. The particular housing used for goats depends not only on the intended use of the goat, but also on the region of the world where they are raised. Historically, domestic goats were generally kept in herds that wandered on hills or other grazing areas, often tended by goatherds who were frequently children or adolescents, similar to the more widely known shepherd. These methods of herding are still used today.

In some parts of the world, especially Europe and North America, distinct breeds of goats are kept for dairy (milk) and for meat production. Excess male kids of dairy breeds are typically slaughtered for meat. Both does and bucks of meat breeds may be slaughtered for meat, as well as older animals of any breed. The meat of older bucks (more than one year old) is generally considered not desirable for meat for human consumption. Castration at a young age prevents the development of typical buck odor.

Dairy goats are generally pastured in summer and may be stabled during the winter. As dairy does are milked daily, they are generally kept close to the milking shed. Their grazing is typically supplemented with hay and concentrates. Stabled goats may be kept in stalls similar to horses, or in larger group pens. In the US system, does are generally rebred annually. In some European commercial dairy systems, the does are bred only twice, and are milked continuously for several years after the second kidding.

Meat goats are more frequently pastured year-round, and may be kept many miles from barns. Angora and other fiber breeds are also kept on pasture or range. Range-kept and pastured goats may be supplemented with hay or concentrates, most frequently during the winter or dry seasons.

In the Indian subcontinent and much of Asia, goats are kept largely for milk production, both in commercial and household settings. The goats in this area may be kept closely housed or may be allowed to range for fodder. The Salem Black goat is herded to pasture in fields and along roads during the day, but is kept penned at night for safe-keeping.

In Africa and the Mideast, goats are typically run in flocks with sheep. This maximizes the production per acre, as goats and sheep prefer different food plants. Multiple types of goat-raising are found in Ethiopia, where four main types have been identified: pastured in annual crop systems, in perennial crop systems, with cattle, and in arid areas, under pastoral (nomadic) herding systems. In all four systems, however, goats were typically kept in extensive systems, with few purchased inputs. Household goats are traditionally kept in Nigeria. While many goats are allowed to wander the homestead or village, others are kept penned and fed in what is called a 'cut-and-carry' system. This type of husbandry is also used in parts of Latin America. Cut-and-carry, which refers to the practice of cutting down grasses, corn or cane for feed rather than allowing the animal access to the field, is particularly suited for types of feed, such as corn or cane, that are easily destroyed by trampling.

Pet goats may be found in many parts of the world when a family keeps one or more animals for emotional reasons rather than as production animals. It is becoming more common for goats to be kept exclusively as pets in North America and Europe.

 Meat 

The taste of goat kid meat is similar to that of spring lamb meat; in fact, in the English-speaking islands of the Caribbean, and in some parts of Asia, particularly Bangladesh, Pakistan, and India, the word "mutton" is used to describe both goat and sheep meat. However, some compare the taste of goat meat to veal or venison, depending on the age and condition of the goat. Its flavor is said to be primarily linked to the presence of 4-methyloctanoic and 4-methylnonanoic acid. It can be prepared in a variety of ways, including stewing, baking, grilling, barbecuing, canning, and frying; it can be minced, curried, or made into sausage. Due to its low fat content, the meat can toughen at high temperatures if cooked without additional moisture. One of the most popular goats grown for meat is the South African Boer, introduced into the United States in the early 1990s. The New Zealand Kiko is also considered a meat breed, as is the myotonic or "fainting goat", a breed originating in Tennessee.

 Milk, butter, and cheese 

Goats produce about 2% of the world's total annual milk supply. Some goats are bred specifically for milk. If the strong-smelling buck is not separated from the does, his scent will affect the milk.

Goat milk naturally has small, well-emulsified fat globules, which means the cream remains suspended in the milk, instead of rising to the top, as in raw cow milk; therefore, it does not need to be homogenized. Indeed, if the milk is to be used to make cheese, homogenization is not recommended, as this changes the structure of the milk, affecting the culture's ability to coagulate the milk and the final quality and yield of cheese.

Dairy goats in their prime (generally around the third or fourth lactation cycle) average——of milk production daily—roughly —during a ten-month lactation, producing more just after freshening and gradually dropping in production toward the end of their lactation. The milk generally averages 3.5% butterfat.

Goat milk is commonly processed into cheese, butter, ice cream, yogurt, cajeta and other products. Goat cheese is known as fromage de chèvre ("goat cheese") in France. Some varieties include Rocamadour and Montrachet. Goat butter is white because goats produce milk with the yellow beta-carotene converted to a colorless form of vitamin A. Goat milk has less cholesterol than cow's milk.

 Nutrition 
The American Academy of Pediatrics discourages feeding infants milk derived from goats. An April 2010 case report summarizes their recommendation and presents "a comprehensive review of the consequences associated with this dangerous practice", also stating, "Many infants are exclusively fed unmodified goat's milk as a result of cultural beliefs as well as exposure to false online information. Anecdotal reports have described a host of morbidities associated with that practice, including severe electrolyte abnormalities, metabolic acidosis, megaloblastic anemia, allergic reactions including life-threatening anaphylactic shock, hemolytic uremic syndrome, and infections." Untreated caprine brucellosis results in a 2% case fatality rate. According to the USDA, doe milk is not recommended for human infants because it contains "inadequate quantities of iron, folate, vitamins C and D, thiamine, niacin, vitamin B6, and pantothenic acid to meet an infant’s nutritional needs" and may cause harm to an infant's kidneys and could cause metabolic damage.

The department of health in the United Kingdom has repeatedly released statements stating on various occasions that "Goats' milk is not suitable for babies, and infant formulas and follow-on formulas based on goats' milk protein have not been approved for use in Europe", and "infant milks based on goats' milk protein are not suitable as a source of nutrition for infants." Moreover, according to the Canadian federal health department Health Canada, most of the dangers of, and counter-indications for, feeding unmodified goat's milk to infants parallel those associated with unmodified cow's milk — especially insofar as allergic reactions go.

However, some farming groups promote the practice. For example, Small Farm Today, in 2005, claimed beneficial use in invalid and convalescent diets, proposing that glycerol ethers, possibly important in nutrition for nursing infants, are much higher in does' milk than in cows' milk. A 1970 book on animal breeding claimed that does' milk differs from cows' or humans' milk by having higher digestibility, distinct alkalinity, higher buffering capacity, and certain therapeutic values in human medicine and nutrition. George Mateljan suggested doe milk can replace ewe milk or cow milk in diets of those who are allergic to certain mammals' milk. However, like cow milk, doe milk has lactose (sugar), and may cause gastrointestinal problems for individuals with lactose intolerance. In fact, the level of lactose is similar to that of cow milk.

Some researchers and companies producing goat's milk products have made claims that goat's milk is better for human health than most Western cow's milk due to it mostly lacking a form of β-casein proteins called A1, and instead mostly containing the A2 form, which does not metabolize to β-casomorphin 7 in the body.

These compositions vary by breed (especially in the Nigerian Dwarf breed), animal, and point in the lactation period.

 Fiber 

The Angora breed of goats produces long, curling, lustrous locks of mohair. The entire body of the goat is covered with mohair and there are no guard hairs. The locks constantly grow to four inches or more in length. Angora crossbreeds, such as the pygora and the nigora, have been created to produce mohair and/or cashgora on a smaller, easier-to-manage animal.

Most goats have softer insulating hairs nearer the skin, and longer guard hairs on the surface. The desirable fiber for the textile industry is the former, and it goes by several names (down, cashmere and pashmina). The coarse guard hairs are of little value as they are too coarse, difficult to spin and difficult to dye. The cashmere goat produces a commercial quantity of cashmere wool, which is one of the most expensive natural fibers commercially produced; cashmere is very fine and soft.

In South Asia, cashmere is called "pashmina" (from Persian pashmina, "fine wool").
In the 18th and early 19th centuries, Kashmir (then called Cashmere by the British), had a thriving industry producing shawls from goat-hair imported from Tibet and Tartary through Ladakh. The shawls were introduced into Western Europe when Napoleon Bonaparte, the General in Chief of the French campaign in Egypt (1798–1801), sent one to Paris. Since these shawls were produced in the upper Kashmir and Ladakh region, the wool came to be known as "cashmere".

 Land clearing 

Goats have been used by humans to clear unwanted vegetation for centuries. They have been described as "eating machines" and "biological control agents". There has been a resurgence of this in North America since 1990, when herds were used to clear dry brush from California hillsides thought to be endangered by potential wildfires. This form of using goats to clear land is sometimes known as conservation grazing. Since then, numerous public and private agencies have hired private herds from companies such as Rent A Goat to perform similar tasks. This may be expensive and their smell may be a nuisance. This practice has become popular in the Pacific Northwest, where they are used to remove invasive species not easily removed by humans, including (thorned) blackberry vines and poison oak. Chattanooga, TN and Spartanburg, SC have used goats to control kudzu, an invasive plant species prevalent in the southeastern United States.

 Medical training 
As a goat's anatomy and physiology is not too dissimilar from that of humans, some countries' militaries use goats to train combat medics. In the United States, goats have become the main animal species used for this purpose after the Pentagon phased out using dogs for medical training in the 1980s. While modern mannequins used in medical training are quite efficient in simulating the behavior of a human body, trainees feel that "the goat exercise provide[s] a sense of urgency that only real life trauma can provide".

 Pets 

Some people choose goats as a pet because of their ability to form close bonds with their human guardians.  Goats are social animals and usually prefer the company of other goats, but because of their herd mentality, they will follow their owner and form close bonds with them, hence their continuing popularity.

Goats are similar to deer with regard to nutrition and need a wide range of food, including things like hay, chaffhaye, grain feed or pelleted grain mix, and loose minerals. Goats generally either inherit certain feeding preferences or learn them after birth.

 Breeds 

Goat breeds fall into overlapping, general categories. They are generally distributed in those used for dairy, fiber, meat, skins, and as companion animals. Some breeds are also particularly noted as pack goats.

 Showing 

Goat breeders' clubs frequently hold shows, where goats are judged on traits relating to conformation, udder quality, evidence of high production, longevity, build and muscling (meat goats and pet goats) and fiber production and the fiber itself (fiber goats). People who show their goats usually keep registered stock and the offspring of award-winning animals command a higher price. Registered goats, in general, are usually higher-priced if for no other reason than that records have been kept proving their ancestry and the production and other data of their sires, dams, and other ancestors. A registered doe is usually less of a gamble than buying a doe at random (as at an auction or sale barn) because of these records and the reputation of the breeder.
Children's clubs such as 4-H also allow goats to be shown. Children's shows often include a showmanship class, where the cleanliness and presentation of both the animal and the exhibitor as well as the handler's ability and skill in handling the goat are scored. In a showmanship class, conformation is irrelevant since this is not what is being judged.

Various "Dairy Goat Scorecards" (milking does) are systems used for judging shows in the US. The American Dairy Goat Association (ADGA) scorecard for an adult doe includes a point system of a hundred total with major categories that include general appearance, the dairy character of a doe (physical traits that aid and increase milk production), body capacity, and specifically for the mammary system. Young stock and bucks are judged by different scorecards which place more emphasis on the other three categories; general appearance, body capacity, and dairy character.

The American Goat Society (AGS) has a similar, but not identical scorecard that is used in their shows. The miniature dairy goats may be judged by either of the two scorecards. The "Angora Goat scorecard" used by the Colored Angora Goat Breeder's Association (CAGBA), which covers the white and the colored goats, includes evaluation of an animal's fleece color, density, uniformity, fineness, and general body confirmation. Disqualifications include: a deformed mouth, broken down pasterns, deformed feet, crooked legs, abnormalities of testicles, missing testicles, more than 3 inch split in scrotum, and close-set or distorted horns.

 Mythology and folklore 

Archaeologists excavating the ancient city of Ebla in Syria discovered, among others, the tomb of some king or great noble which included 
a throne decorated with bronze goat heads. That led to this tomb becoming known as "The Tomb of the Lord of the Goats".

According to Norse mythology, the god of thunder, Thor, has a chariot that is pulled by the goats Tanngrisnir and Tanngnjóstr. At night when he sets up camp, Thor eats the meat of the goats, but takes care that all bones remain whole. Then he wraps the remains up, and in the morning, the goats always come back to life to pull the chariot. When a farmer's son who is invited to share the meal breaks one of the goats' leg bones to suck the marrow, the animal's leg remains broken in the morning, and the boy is forced to serve Thor as a servant to compensate for the damage.

Possibly related, the Yule Goat is one of the oldest Scandinavian and Northern European Yule and Christmas symbols and traditions. Yule Goat originally denoted the goat that was slaughtered around Yule, but it may also indicate a goat figure made out of straw. It is also used about the custom of going door-to-door singing carols and getting food and drinks in return, often fruit, cakes and sweets. "Going Yule Goat" is similar to the British custom wassailing, both with  roots. The Gävle Goat is a giant version of the Yule Goat, erected every year in the Swedish city of Gävle.

The Greek god Pan is said to have the upper body of a man and the horns and lower body of a goat. Pan was a very lustful god, nearly all of the myths involving him had to do with him chasing nymphs. He is also credited with creating the pan flute.

The goat is one of the 12-year cycle of animals which appear in the Chinese zodiac related to the Chinese calendar. Each animal is associated with certain personality traits; those born in a year of the goat are predicted to be shy, introverted, creative, and perfectionist.

Several mythological hybrid creatures are believed to consist of parts of the goat, including the Chimera. The Capricorn sign in the Western zodiac is usually depicted as a goat with a fish's tail. Fauns and satyrs are mythological creatures that are part goat and part human. The mineral bromine is named from the Greek word "brόmos", which means "stench of he-goats".

Popular Christian folk tradition in Europe associated Satan with imagery of goats. A common superstition in the Middle Ages was that goats whispered lewd sentences in the ears of the saints. The origin of this belief was probably the behavior of the buck in rut, the very epitome of lust. The common medieval depiction of the devil was that of a goat-like face with horns and small beard (a goatee). The Black Mass, a probably mythological "Satanic mass", involved Satan manifesting as a black goat for worship.

The goat has had a lingering connection with Satanism and pagan religions, even into modern times. The inverted pentagram, a symbol used in Satanism, is said to be shaped like a goat's head. The "Baphomet of Mendes" refers to a Satanic goat-like figure from 19th-century occultism.

 
In Finland the tradition of Nuutinpäivä—St. Knut's Day, January 13—involves young men dressed as goats (Finnish: Nuuttipukki) who visit houses. Usually the dress was an inverted fur jacket, a leather or birch bark mask, and horns. Unlike the analogues Santa Claus, Nuuttipukki was a scary character (cf. Krampus). The men dressed as Nuuttipukki wandered from house to house, came in, and typically demanded food from the household and especially leftover alcoholic beverages. In Finland the Nuuttipukki tradition is still kept alive in areas of Satakunta, Southwest Finland and Ostrobothnia. However, nowadays the character is usually played by children and now involves a happy encounter.

The common Russian surname Kozlov'', means "goat". Goatee refers to a style of facial hair incorporating hair on a man's chin, so named because of some similarity to a goat's facial feature.

Religion

Goats are mentioned many times in the Bible. Their importance in ancient Israel is indicated by the seven different Hebrew and three Greek terms used in the Bible. A goat is considered a "clean" animal by Jewish dietary laws and a kid was slaughtered for an honored guest. It was also acceptable for some kinds of sacrifices. Goat-hair curtains were used in the tent that contained the tabernacle (Exodus 25:4). Its horns can be used instead of sheep's horn to make a shofar. On Yom Kippur, the festival of the Day of Atonement, two goats were chosen and lots were drawn for them. One was sacrificed and the other allowed to escape into the wilderness, symbolically carrying with it the sins of the community. From this comes the word "scapegoat". A leader or king was sometimes compared to a male goat leading the flock.

In Matthew 25:31–46, Jesus said that like a shepherd he will separate the nations placing on his right hand the sheep, those who have shown kindness to needy and suffering disciples of Jesus and others. These he will reward, but the goats at his left hand, who failed to show kindness, will be punished. Although both sheep and goats were valued as livestock, this preference for sheep may relate to the importance of wool and the superior meat of adult sheep compared to the poor meat of adult goats.

Satanism 

In some depictions the devil is depicted, like Baphomet, as a goat, therefore the goat and goat's head is a significant symbol throughout Satanism. The inverted pentagram is the symbol used for Satanism, sometimes depicted with the goat's head of Baphomet within it, which originated from the Church of Satan. The goat's head and head of Baphomet is also used in the logo for The Satanic Temple, which also featured the inverted pentagram.

Feral goats 

Goats readily revert to the wild (become feral) if given the opportunity. The only domestic animal known to return to feral life as swiftly is the cat. Feral goats have established themselves in many areas: they occur in Australia, New Zealand, Great Britain, the Galapagos and in many other places. When feral goats reach large populations in habitats which provide unlimited water supply and which do not contain sufficient large predators or which are otherwise vulnerable to goats' aggressive grazing habits, they may have serious effects, such as removing native scrub, trees and other vegetation which is required by a wide range of other creatures, not just other grazing or browsing animals. Feral goats are extremely common in Australia, with an estimated 2.6 million in the mid-1990s. However, in other circumstances where predator pressure is maintained, they may be accommodated into some balance in the local food web.

See also
Goat tower
Sheep–goat hybrid

References

External links

 British Goat Society
 Goat breeds from the Department of Animal Science, Oklahoma State University
 International Goat Association
 North American Packgoats Association
 The American Dairy Goat Association

Capra (genus)
 
Goat's-milk cheeses
Herbivorous mammals
Livestock
Mammals described in 1758
Taxa named by Carl Linnaeus